Phanera vahlii is a perennial creeper of the family Fabaceae native to the Indian subcontinent.

The roasted seeds of this woody climber are edible.

Phanera species have 2–3 fertile stamens.

Distribution 
Phanera vahlii is found from Sikkim and Nepal across India and Himachal Pradesh and Punjab, Pakistan.

Local names 
In Hindi, it is called मालू malu, but also mahul, jallaur and jallur. In Nepali it is called भोर्ला . In Odia, it is called ;  ସିଆଳି Siali, இலை மந்தாரை in Tamil. In Telugu, it is called అడ్డాకు.

References

External links 

 Flowers of India: Phanera vahlii
 Flora of Pakistan: Phanera vahlii

Cercidoideae
Flora of Nepal
Fabales of Asia